Janet Iacobuzio (born January 2, 1962) is an American television soap opera writer.

Life
She was born in 1962.

In 2020 she was one of the recruits for a fiction app named "Radish" which had $63m of funding and it was opening an office in LA. The experienced soap writers recruited included Iacobuzion, Addie Walsh, Lisa Connor, Leah Laiman, and Jean Passanante.

Positions held 
All My Children
 Associate head writer: 1993–1994 (hired by Megan McTavish), 2001–2003
 Script writer: 2000–2001

Another World
 Associate head writer: 1994–1995
 Script writer: 1989–1992 (hired by Donna M. Swajeski)

As the World Turns
 Associate head writer: 1996; June 9, 2010 – September 17, 2010
 Script writer: October 5, 2009 – June 8, 2010

Days of Our Lives
 Script writer: March 21, 2011 – February 15, 2012; August 17, 2012 – August 5, 2015

General Hospital
 Breakdown writer: January 17, 2012 – February 21, 2012, December 4, 2015 – July 12, 2016
 Co-head writer: May 1997 – December 5, 1997
 Associate head writer: 1997, 1998
Script Writer: July 12, 2016 – December 1, 2016

One Life to Live
 Script editor: May 15–25, 2009
 Associate head writer: February 24, 2005 – February 22, 2008; May 2, 2008 – August 17, 2009; September 16–17, 2009

Sunset Beach
 Script writer: 1998–1999

Awards and nominations 
Daytime Emmy Award
 Win, 2012, Best Writing, Days of Our Lives
 Win, 2008, Best Writing, One Life to Live
 Nomination, 2006, Best Writing, One Life to Live
 Nomination, 2001–2004, Best Writing, All My Children
 Nomination, 1997 & 1998, Best Writing, General Hospital
 Nomination, 1996, Best Writing, Another World

Writers Guild of America Award
 Nomination, 2009, Best Writing, "One Life to Live"
 Nomination, 2005, Best Writing, One Life to Live
 Win, 2000, 2001, 2003, Best Writing, All My Children
 Nomination, 1998, Best Writing, General Hospital
 Win, 1997, Best Writing, General Hospital
 Nomination, 1994 & 1995, Best Writing, Another World
 Nomination, 1993, Best Writing, All My Children

Head writer tenures

References

External links 
 

Iacobuzio, Janet
1962 births
Living people
American women television writers
Writers Guild of America Award winners
Women soap opera writers
21st-century American women